The 2019–20 Ranji Trophy was the 86th season of the Ranji Trophy, the first-class cricket tournament that took place in India. It was contested by 38 teams, divided into four groups, with nine teams in Group B. The group stage ran from 9 December 2019 to 15 February 2020. The top five teams across Group A and Group B progressed to the quarter-finals of the competition.

In the round seven match between Madhya Pradesh and Uttar Pradesh, Madhya Pradesh's Ravi Yadav became the first bowler to take a hat-trick in his first over on his debut in a first-class cricket match.

Ahead of the final round of group stage matches, Saurashtra had qualified for the quarter-finals from Group B. Karnataka also progressed from Group B, after they beat Baroda by eight wickets in their final match.

Points table

Fixtures

Round 1

Round 2

Round 3

Round 4

Round 5

Round 6

Round 7

Round 8

Round 9

References

Ranji Trophy seasons
Ranji Trophy Group B
Ranji Trophy
Ranji Trophy